Paulius Golubickas (born 19 August 1999) is a Lithuanian footballer who plays mostly as an attacking midfielder or forward for FK Žalgiris and the Lithuania national team.

Career
Golubickas made his international debut for Lithuania on 25 March 2019, starting in the friendly against Azerbaijan before being substituted out for Justinas Marazas in the 62nd minute, with the match finishing as a 0–0 draw. In Croatian First Football League he made his debut on 9 February 2020.

Career statistics

International

Honours
Sūduva
Lithuanian Supercup: 2019
 Lithuanian Football Cup 2019
 A Lyga 2019

Individual
 A Lyga Young Player of the Month: March 2019, May 2019
 A Lyga Young Player of the Year

References

External links
 
 

1999 births
Living people
People from Ignalina
Lithuanian footballers
Lithuania youth international footballers
Lithuania international footballers
Lithuanian expatriate footballers
Lithuanian expatriate sportspeople in England
Lithuanian expatriate sportspeople in Croatia
Expatriate footballers in England
Expatriate footballers in Croatia
Association football forwards
Yeovil Town F.C. players
FK Dainava Alytus players
FK Sūduva Marijampolė players
HNK Gorica players
A Lyga players
Croatian Football League players